The Terisaqqan (Terısaqqan; , Tersakkan) is a river of northern Kazakhstan. In the upper reaches it dries up, and it freezes to the bottom in some winters. Peak flow is in April during snowmelt.

References

Rivers of Kazakhstan